is a Japanese-Peruvian actor and model. He is nicknamed . His wife is former AKB48 member Nozomi Kawasaki.

Filmography

Films

References

External links
Official profile  

1982 births
Living people
Japanese male actors
Japanese male models
People from Trujillo, Peru
Peruvian emigrants to Japan
Peruvian people of Japanese descent